Yaeyama may refer to:

 Yaeyama Islands, an archipelago in Okinawa Prefecture, Japan
 Yaeyama District, Okinawa, an administrative division covering most of the Yaeyama Islands
 Yaeyama language, a language spoken in the Yaeyama Islands
 Japanese ship Yaeyama, the name of several ships of the Japanese Navy